The Dinnie Stones (also called Stanes or Steens) are a pair of Scottish lifting stones located in Potarch, Aberdeenshire. They remain in use as lifting stones.

The stones are composed of granite, with iron rings affixed.

The stones were reportedly selected in the 1830s as counterweights for use in maintaining the Potarch Bridge. They were lost following World War I, but were rediscovered in 1953 by David P. Webster.

Replicas of the Dinnie Stones (pioneered by Gordon Dinnie) have been used in international competition.

World Records

Carrying
Only 6 other men have ever been recorded as matching this feat (unassisted without using any weightlifting straps). The first to replicate it was Donald Dinnie's father Robert Dinnie. The feat then went unrepeated for 113 years, until Northern Irishsman Jack Shanks did so on 3 June 1973. It was followed by Mark Haydock (2012), Mark Felix (2014), Brian Irwin (2017) and Pete Seddon (2019).

Another feat of strength is to pick up the stones from the sides and walk them in a farmers walk style carry until dropping them. It was previously held by Brian Shaw, who carried them . 

American Strongman Kevin Faires holds the record for the longest distance walked with the replica Dinnie stones, which currently stands at 31 ft and 7 inches. 

While the replica Dinnie Stones are very close in weight (with the replicas being 1lb heavier), there are several differences between the sets of stones. The replica stones have slightly different handles, the sets of stones are different shapes, and the replicas sit one inch higher than the original stones. The rules for the walk also differ, with lifters being allowed one 10 second drop while walking with the replica stones.

Lifting
, more than 220 individuals have managed to lift the original stones off the ground (also known as putting the wind under the stones, i.e. just lifting/not walking with them). David Prowse was the first to do so assisted (with straps) in October, 1963. Jack Shanks (1972), Syd Strachan, Jim Splaine, Imlach Shearer (1973) and Jim Fraser (1978) all managed to lift them unassisted (raw grip). Five women have also managed to lift the stones. The first was Jan Todd in 1979, a feat which was not matched by any woman for the next 39 years until Leigh Holland-Keen in 2018 (both assisted with straps). In January 2019, Emmajane Smith lifted the stones without straps, making her the first woman to do so. In June 2019, Finland's Annika Eilmann lifted the stones without straps and also held them, making her the first woman to do so. In October 2019, Chloe Brennan at a bodyweight of 64 kg (141 lb) lifted the stones (unassisted partial lift) and became the lightest lifter to put the wind beneath the stones.

Jim Splaine was the first person to lift the Dinnie Stones more than fifty times, a feat he went on to achieve 67 times from 1973 to 1990. Most of those lifts were done at a body weight of only 65 kg (143 lb). Brett Nicol holds the world record for lifting the Dinnie Stones for the most number of times, with 460 lifts from 2008 to date.

The record for holding the stones up unassisted for the longest time is 46.30 seconds, set on 18 May 2019 by Mark Haydock of Lancashire, England. This record was first introduced at the Aboyne Highland Games in 2016, and the first holder of the record was James Gardner. Annika Eilmann of Finland holds the women's record in this with a time of 10.31 seconds, also set in 2019

See also
History of physical training and fitness
Lifting stone
Húsafell Stone

References

Stones
Sport in Aberdeenshire
Tourist attractions in Aberdeenshire
History of Aberdeenshire
Weightlifting in Scotland
Highland games in Scotland
Lost objects